An election to Cavan County Council took place on 24 May 2019 as part of that year's Irish local elections. 18 councillors were elected for a five-year term of office from three local electoral areas (LEAs) by single transferable vote. The 2018 boundary review committee did not recommend any alteration in the LEAs used by Cavan in the 2014 elections.

The election was disastrous for Sinn Féin, which lost all but one of their seats. Fianna Fáil returned with one extra seat, to give a total of eight seats; while Independent candidate Brendan Fay was elected and became the first Independent councillor in the county since 1999. Fine Gael returned with the same number of seats as on the previous council.

Results by party

Results by local electoral area

Bailieborough–Cootehill

Ballyjamesduff

Cavan–Belturbet

Results by gender

Changes since 2019 Elections
 †Ballyjamesduff Fianna Fáil Cllr Shane P. O'Reilly resigned from the party citing irreconcilable differences on 18 June 2020 and became an Independent.

Footnotes

Sources

References

2019 Irish local elections
2019